Yvonne Suddick is a British figure skater who competed in ice dance.

With partner Malcolm Cannon, Suddick won the bronze medal at the 1967 World Figure Skating Championships and the silver medal at the 1968 World Figure Skating Championships.

Competitive highlights 
With  Roger Kennerson

With Malcolm Cannon

References 

British female ice dancers
Year of birth uncertain
Living people
Year of birth missing (living people)